Sonhar, aka Haji Qasim Sumro, is a village and deh in Tando Bago taluka of Badin District, Sindh. As of 2017, it has a population of 2,382, in 463 households. It is part of the tapedar circle of Mir Himat Ali.

References

Populated places in Badin District